Tomorrow Starts Today is the 2006 debut studio album by Canadian alternative rock band Mobile. It was released on April 18, 2006, in Canada and August 21, 2007, in the United States. Four singles were released from the album: "Montreal Calling" (2005), "Out of My Head" (2006), "See Right Through Me" (2006), and "Dusting Down the Stars" (2007). The first two singles were released before the album's release; as well, "Montreal Calling" was available in late 2005 as a track on MuchMusic's Big Shiny Tunes 10.

Track listings

Canadian release
 "Hands Tied" – 3:16
 "New York Minute" – 3:27 
 "Out of My Head" – 3:36
 "Montreal Calling" – 3:07
 "See Right Through Me" – 4:15
 "Lookin' Out" – 3:16
 "Scars" – 3:55
 "Dusting Down the Stars" – 4:07
 "Tomorrow Starts Today" – 3:36
 "How Can I Be Saved" – 3:06
 "Lovedrug" – 4:12
 "Bleeding Words" – 6:19

U.S. release
 "Montreal Calling" – 3:07
 "Tomorrow Starts Today" – 3:36
 "Out of My Head" – 3:16
 "See Right Through Me" – 3:27 
 "Dusting Down The Stars" – 3:36
 "New York Minute" – 4:15
 "Hand Tied" – 3:16
 "Scars" – 3:55
 "How Can I Be Saved" – 4:07
 "Lookin' Out" – 3:06
 "Lovedrug" – 4:12
 "Bleeding Words" – 6:19

Pepsi Access Bundle release
 "Out Of My Head (Claude Le Gauche remix)" - 4:13
 "Scars" - 3:55
 "See Right Through Me" - 3:27

Mini Card Sleeve release
 "Tomorrow Starts Today" – 3:36
 "See Right Through Me" – 3:27 
 "Bleeding Words" – 6:19
 "Montreal Calling" – 3:07

Personnel
Adapted credits from the liner notes of Tomorrow Starts Today.
Mobile
Mat Joly – lead vocals, backing vocals, lyrics
Christian Brais – guitars, keyboards, piano, percussion, pre-production, additional engineering
Frank Williamson – guitars
Dominic Viola – bass
Pierre-Marc Hamelin – drums

Additional personnel
Matt DeMatteo – production, engineering, guitars, keyboards, backing vocals
Mark Stent – mixing
Alex Dromgoole – assistant engineer
David Emery – assistant engineer
Tom Baker – mastering
Mark Makoway – recording
Nick Blagona – recording

Certifications

References

2006 debut albums
Mobile (band) albums